Theodore Capistrano Boborol (born December 19, 1979) is a Filipino film and television director who started as a creative researcher for Star Cinema in 2000. Boborol made his directorial debut with the teen romantic comedy-drama film Just the Way You Are (2015). He rose to prominence for directing his second feature film, Vince and Kath and James (2016), which was a commercial and critical success. His third film Finally Found Someone, is one of the highest-grossing films of 2017 in the Philippines.

He is one of the resident television and film directors for ABS-CBN Entertainment and Star Cinema.

Life and career
Boborol was born in Dapitan, Zamboanga del Norte, Philippines. His mother, Zenaida Capistrano Boborol, was a public school teacher, and his father, Tomas Adaza Boborol, is a retired government employee.

Filmography

Movies

Television

Awards and nominations

See also
ABS-CBN
Star Cinema

References

Living people
1979 births
Filipino film directors
University of the Philippines Diliman alumni